The End of an Era is the third studio album by Australian rapper Iggy Azalea. It was released independently on 13 August 2021 through Azalea's label Bad Dreams Records and Empire Distribution, with the deluxe edition following on 17 September 2021. Taking inspiration from the end of her 20s for the title, Azalea stated that she wanted the album to be a "time capsule" of that decade of her life. The End of an Era includes guest appearances from Bia, Sophia Scott and Ellise on the standard edition, while Alice Chater and Tyga are featured on the deluxe edition. Production was handled by Azalea's frequent collaborator J. White Did It and several others. It was preceded by three singles: "Sip It", "Brazil" and "Iam the Stripclub".

The End of an Era received positive reviews from music critics. The album reached number nine on the Australian Hip Hop/R&B albums chart and number thirty six on the UK R&B Albums chart. It failed to replicate the success of her debut and sophomore album in any territory. To further promote the album, Azalea joined Pitbull as the opening act on his I Feel Good Tour.

Background and release
In 2019, Azalea released her second studio album In My Defense and her fifth EP Wicked Lips. Following the release of the latter, she began working on further music with several producers, including J. White Did It with whom she had collaborated extensively on In My Defense and Wicked Lips. White described Azalea as "laser focused on getting the people something fresh, something new" and praised her work ethic. On 21 August 2020, she released a standalone single with Tinashe titled "Dance Like Nobody's Watching". 

In March 2021, Azalea tweeted that the sound of her third studio album would mark a return to her mixtape roots. She revealed the cover art on 3 August 2021 on her Instagram. Two days later, she shared the track listing along with the pre-order of the album and promotional single "Sex on the Beach". On 17 September 2021, Azalea released the deluxe edition of The End of an Era, featuring three additional songs.

Promotion

Singles
On 2 April 2021, Azalea released "Sip It", a collaboration with Tyga, as the official lead single from The End of an Era. It includes a B-side titled "Brazil". A music video was uploaded for "Sip It" on the same day, while "Brazil" received a remix featuring Brazilian drag queen and recording artist Gloria Groove on 20 April 2021 accompanied by a visualiser for the original version. "Sip It" peaked at 40 on the New Zealand Hot Singles chart. "Sip It" does not appear on the standard version of the album, but appears on the deluxe version. "Brazil" appears on both versions of the album.

On 2 July 2021, Azalea released the second single from The End of an Era, "Iam the Stripclub". Its music video, uploaded the same day, attracted controversy due to accusations of blackfishing; Azalea called the allegations "ridiculous and baseless".

On 5 August 2021, a week before the album, Azalea released "Sex on the Beach" featuring Sophia Scott as the promotional single from The End of an Era. Azalea said in an interview with Billboard that she decided to keep Scott, a relatively unknown artist, on the song, "I liked her voice and I wanted to stay true to the intent of the song. For me this album is more about a passion project than wanting it to be some gigantic commercial success."

Tour
To further promote the album, Azalea joined Pitbull as the opening act on his I Feel Good Tour. The tour covered 33 cities across the United States. It began on 20 August 2021 in Clarkston, Michigan and finished on 16 October 2021 in Rapid City, South Dakota.

Artwork and title
The standard edition artwork for The End of an Era depicts Azalea lying on a wall covered in tiles. Behind her is a statue of three people holding a globe with the album title in neon capital letters, inspired by the film Scarface (1983). The deluxe edition artwork also features the statue, but shows Azalea lying in an inflatable chair in the middle of a pool. She is surrounded by drowning men and banknotes, a reference to the film The Great Gatsby (2013). Both artworks were photographed by Thom Kerr.

Azalea stated that the title The End of an Era refers to the end of her 20s and that she wanted the album to be a "time capsule" of that decade of her life. She also mentioned that she would take a hiatus from music for several years after the album's release to focus on other projects.

Critical reception 

Tom Hull responded positively to the album, particularly the production behind songs like "Emo Club Anthem" and "Good Times with Bad People": "I'm feeling kind of weird liking a song where the refrain is 'I love drugs,' or another explaining 'You need a good girl / I'm just a good time.' I suppose I could blame the beats." Happy Magazine also rated the album highly, with reviewer Matthew Leong saying, "The End of an Era is a club-ready farewell from one of hip hop's most intriguing and visually creative figures. The young rapper who fought tooth and nail to be heard, is leaving behind a musical legacy that demands you to get on your feet, take a shot and dance the night away." In another positive review, Cameron Sunkel of EDM calls tracks "STFU", "Iam the Stripclub", and "Emo Club Anthem" as standout album tracks saying of the latter: "The self-indulgent 'Emo Club Anthem' boasts a moody, detuned club synth that sounds like the cross between a future house and bass house producer's repertoire." Gloria called the album "this generation's Blackout".

Track listing

Charts

Release history

References

2021 albums
Iggy Azalea albums
Empire Distribution albums